"Communication" is a song by Australian singer John Farnham and Danni'Elle. The song was recorded and released in 1989 and peaked at number 13 on the ARIA Charts. The single came with full colour poster and "Sex & Drugs & AIDS" booklet.

Track listing
 "Communication" by John Farnham & Danni'Elle	
 "Attitude" by Question Time

Chart history

References

1989 singles
1989 songs
John Farnham songs
Song articles with missing songwriters